Hast is a village in Hana Rural District, in the Central District of Semirom County, Isfahan Province, Iran. At the 2006 census, its population was 190, in 45 families.

References

Populated places in Semirom County